Kim Eul-dong (born September 5, 1945) is a South Korean politician and former actress. She entered politics after retiring from acting. She was the 18th, 19th (Songpa District) member of the National Assembly, and the female chairperson of the Saenuri Party. She is the granddaughter of Kim Chwa-chin, the daughter of Kim Du-han, and the mother of actor Song Il-gook. In 2016, 20th General Election, she failed to get elected as member of the nation assembly.

References

Living people
Andong Kim clan
South Korean television actresses
South Korean film actresses
Members of the National Assembly (South Korea)
1945 births
21st-century South Korean women politicians
21st-century South Korean politicians
South Korean Buddhists
Female members of the National Assembly (South Korea)